is a town located in Gunma Prefecture, Japan. , the town had an estimated population of 26,267 in 10,382 households, and a population density of 840 persons per km².

Geography
Ōra is located in the extreme southern corner Gunma prefecture, bordered by Tochigi Prefecture to the north.

Surrounding municipalities
Gunma Prefecture
 Ōta
 Tatebayashi
 Ōizumi
 Chiyoda
 Meiwa
Tochigi Prefecture
 Ashikaga

Demographics
Per Japanese census data, the population of Ōra peaked around the year 2000 and has declined since.

History
The villages of Nakano, Takashima and Nagae were created within Ōra District, Gunma Prefecture on April 1, 1889 with the creation of the modern municipalities system after the Meiji Restoration. On March 1, 1955, Nakano and Takashima merged to form the village of Nakajima. Nakae merged with neighboring Tominaga and Eiraku to form the village of Chiyoda. However, on September 30, 1956 the former Nakae village was transferred from Chiyoda to Nakajima, and Nakajma was renamed Ōra on January 1, 1957. Ōra was elevated to town status on April 1, 1968.

Government
Ōra has a mayor-council form of government with a directly elected mayor and a unicameral town council of 14 members. Ōra, together with the other municipalities in Ōra District contributes three members to the Gunma Prefectural Assembly. In terms of national politics, the town is part of Gunma 3rd district of the lower house of the Diet of Japan.

Economy

Education
Ōra has four public elementary schools and two public middle schools operated by the town government, and one public high school operated by the Gunma prefecture Board of Education.

Transportation

Railway
 Tōbu Railway –Tōbu Koizumi Line
 -

Highway

Local attractions
 Ōra Symbol Tower
 Matsumoto Park
 Tatara Marshland

References

External links

Official Website 

Towns in Gunma Prefecture
Ōra, Gunma